The Alcaeorrhynchus grandis is a genus species of the family Pentatomidae. Also known as Giant Strong-nosed Stink Bug, the Alcaeorrhynchus grandis can be found through Brazil, Colombia, Mexico, and the southern United States. As a predator, this stink bug can follow frass trails created by prey.

References

External links
 Alcaeorrhynchus grandis on the UF / IFAS Featured Creatures Web site

Pentatomidae
Insects described in 1851
Arthropods of Colombia